Sarawak FA State Football Team was a defunct football team which represented the Malaysian region (formerly state) of Sarawak from 1974 to 2020 in the Malaysian football league. It was one of the 14 Malaysian state teams of the Malaysian football structure before the Malaysian football league demanded all teams competing in the country's top two leagues to be run as or changed to professional clubs by 2021. It is also important to note that Sarawak FA is a football team that is not run as a professional football club, but rather a team that was funded and run by a Malaysian state football association that relied mostly on state government grants. How the team was run was much like all the other Malaysian state football teams competing in the old Malaysian football system before the year 2021 too. To outsiders who are not familiar with the Malaysian football system or league (before the year 2020), the team was simply known as Sarawak FA because it was run by the Football Association of Sarawak (FAS). To those who follow Malaysian football on the other hand, the team was simply known as Sarawak or the Sarawak State Football Team.

The team's home matches used to be played at the 26,000 capacity Sarawak State Stadium in Kuching, the capital city of Sarawak.

Having won a few major Malaysian football honours and trophies, the team had won the Malaysia FA Cup in 1992, the old Malaysian Premier League in 1997 (which was Malaysian top-tier division league at the time) and the Malaysia Charity Shield in 1998. In 2013, the team won the second-tier division league, the Malaysia Premier League, which is their first domestic trophy in 12 years, in which they were promoted to the Malaysia Super League, the Malaysian top-tier division league, the following year.

The team last played in the third-tier division in Malaysian football, Malaysia M3 League in 2020 but due financial constraints faced by FAS at the time, the team's parent body which runs the team, Sarawak FA did not register to compete in the Malaysia M3 League the following year. As the team did not compete in the 2021 Malaysia M3 league, many football fans in Malaysia saw this as the end to a once legendary team from Sarawak. Although there is a club, supported by FAS, which started to use the name Sarawak United to compete in the second-tier division in Malaysian football, the Malaysia Premier League, from the year 2020 onwards, Sarawakian football purists only accepted the team as a "reincarnation" of the old Sarawak FA team, and not its successor.

History

Early years
Early incarnations of the team really existed after the creation of the Crown Colony of Sarawak. Although there were football activities which existed in present-day Malaysian region of Sarawak before World War I, most of the activities focused on local football league or cup competitions created by Europeans, mostly British, who settled in Sarawak at the time. It was not until the creation of the Borneo Cup football cup competition in the 1950s, that the world would see a football team representing Sarawak and using the name of Sarawak appearing in a tournament. Sarawak would go on win the tournament six times before the tournament was last held in 1988.

After the formation Malaysia in 1963, the team simply became known as the Sarawak State Football Team because it is a team funded by the Malaysian state government of Sarawak to compete and represent the state of Sarawak in the Malaysian football system. It was one of the 14 Malaysian state football teams that existed in the Malaysian football system before 2021. All the 14 Malaysian state teams operated just like the Sarawak State Football Team before 2021, in which they are not professional clubs but rather teams representing the Malaysian states or a Malaysian state football associations, funded by their respective state governments to compete in Malaysian football competitions. Outsiders who are not familiar with the Malaysian football system before 2020 would come to recognise these teams as state FA teams, hence Sarawak State Football Team was also known as Sarawak FA.

Despite already joining mainstream Malaysian football since the formation of the country in 1963, Sarawak State Football Team only competed in Malaysia national football tournaments for the first time in 1979. This was only after an individual known as Taha Ariffin made reforms to the association that governs football in Sarawak by creating the Football Association of Sarawak (FAS) in 1974. Sarawak FA were also founding members of the Malaysia's first ever national football league competition known as the Liga Malaysia which was first played in 1982. It was however an amateur football league which was created to determine which team gets to play in the Malaysia Cup competition from 1982 to 1988, before the introduction of the Malaysian Semi-Professional league in 1989.

Amateur and semi-professional (Semi-Pro) Era 

During Malaysia's amateur football league era from 1982 to 1988, Sarawak were regulars in the league but had never achieved any significant success in the league or major cup competitions in the country. However, during the amateur era, it was the first time that Malaysian football fans would come to pay attention to the Sarawak State Football Team after the emergence of Awang Mahyan Awang Mohamed who was tasked by the FAS to coach the team from the year 1988. His era as Sarawak State Football Team head coach would come to be known by fans of the team as the 'Ngap Sayot' era.

Sarawak State Football Team's history in the semi-professional era of Malaysian football would forever be associated to Awang Mahyan's team. He has created a team that was high-spirited and full of Sarawakian nationalistic pride when ever the team plays. With such enthusiasm by his players whenever they play, they were able to beat their opponents who were deemed much stronger and better sides during the time. One of the most famous moments in Sarawak football was in 1988 when Awang Mahyan's team managed to reach the Malaysia Cup semi-final round that year. Sarawak looked to be on the course to make their first final in the competition, but unfortunately due to a referee's misjudgement during the quarter-final match in Kuala Lumpur saw the team controversially eliminated from the tournament that year. Some of the team's players even claimed that there was a brawl between them and law enforcement personnel after the match. The incident also strained national integration in which the FAS took the decision to withdraw their affiliation from the Football Association of Malaysia (FAM) for a while following the incident.

The 'Ngap Sayot' catchphrase as many Malaysian football fans would associate with the Sarawak State Football Team emerged during the time Awang Mahyan was head coach of the team too. It was a translation from the colloquial Sarawakian Malay phrase of "(to) eat vegetables". It was used to mock any team who face the Sarawak State Football Team when ever there is any match played by the team. The catchphrase was inaugurated after the Sarawak State Football Team and their fans, at the time, have made it a ritual to always chant for their team by saying that they can easily beat their team's opponents, hence metamorphically saying that the opposing team is something that can be eaten easily - just like vegetables.

Other catchphrases for the Sarawak State Football Team also emerged during the amateur and semi-pro era of Malaysian football such as 'Ngap Ajak' and 'Tebang Bala Sidak' but none were as iconic as the 'Ngap Sayot' catchphrase. Fans of the team would also create catchphrases such as the Spirit of 88 (Semangat 88) many years after the Ngap Sayot era as means to pay tribute to the Sarawak State Football Team during the amateur era of Malaysian football which ended in 1988.

Awang Mahyan would go on to coach the team until 1990 (after the semi-pro era was introduced in 1989). Whatever Awang Mahyan has done for Sarawak football, he will always be remembered as one of the fathers of Sarawakian football revolution because he transformed a Sarawakian side from perennial underachievers to a force to be reckoned with in Malaysian football during his time as head coach, despite never winning any major trophies with the team.

After Awang Mahyan's departure, FAS subsequently named Wahet Uji as Awang Mahyan's successor in 1991. Wahet's tenure as Sarawak State Football Team head coach however lasted for only about one year. It was clear that his predecessor had left a huge impact on the team and he had big shoes to fill. FAS opted instead to look for a foreigner to manage the team after the departure of Wahet.

In 1992 Sarawak football fans would be introduced to an individual who would go on to become a legendary manager for the team; Alan Vest. The Englishman who played international football representing New Zealand as a player, won the team their first ever major trophy during his first year in charge, which was the Malaysia FA Cup. Although Vest's time as Sarawak State Football Team manager would forever be remembered fondly by Sarawak football fans for many good reasons to this day, one of those reasons has got to be because he was the first man to transform Sarawak State Football Team into a team that won trophies in Malaysian football.

Vest was still Sarawak State Football Team manager during the last season of the Malaysian Semi-Pro football era in 1993 and at the first season of the Malaysian Professional football era in 1994. Sarawak State Football Team were also league runners-up in 1993 but Vest would go on to win more major trophies in Malaysian football for Sarawak after the introduction of the Malaysian Professional football era as well.

Early years in the Malaysian Professional Football era 

Under the management of  Vest during the early years of the professional era of Malaysian football, the team went on win more trophies. This was also thanks to the huge investment made by FAS who assembled the squad that Vest wanted to compete in the Malaysian football competitions. FAS' investment paid off because during the early years of the Malaysian professional football era, Sarawak were the most consistent side in Malaysia. Sarawak went on to win the Malaysian top division league title in 1997 which was during the time was known as the Malaysia Premier League (the country's top division league is only known as the Malaysia Super League from the year 2004). It was truly the greatest achievement by the Sarawak State Football Team to date, as they had so far won the Malaysian top division only once so far. Apart from winning the Malaysian top division title, the team also won the Malaysia Charity Cup in 1998 too. It could be summarised for now, that all of the Sarawak State Football Team's success in winning major trophies in Malaysian football had so far came under the era when Vest was team manager.

The Sarawak State Football Team also played in the 1998–99 Asian Cup Winners' Cup but were eliminated from the competition by Japanese side Kashima Antlers in which the gulf between the two teams was so great that the Sarawak State Football Team, which at the time was made up of all local players, suffered a 14-2 trouncing (on aggregate) in the quarter-finals stages of the competition. It would be the only appearance by a Sarawakian team in a continental competition to date.

Vest unfortunately had to leave as team manager in 1999 after Malaysian football authorities decided that they wanted a change in policy on foreign player and coaches that year. His place was taken over by former team captain Abdul Jalil Ramli who was Vest's apprentice and assistant since 1998. Jalil was unfortunate as he failed to win Sarawak State Football Team's first Malaysia Cup title in 1999, after qualifying for the final of the competition. They were beaten 2-1 by a Brunei representative team that had import players playing for them at the time as opposed to the Sarawak State Football Team who did not or were not allowed to field any import player. Jalil was again unfortunate in 2001 after the Sarawak State Football Team managed by him were beaten by Selangor State Football Team 0-1 that year in the Malaysia FA Cup final.

Jalil would leave as Sarawak State Football Team manager in 2003 and after he left, Sarawak State Football Team would begin its "era of uncertainty". Although the Sarawak State Football Team became one of the eight teams who formed the inaugural Malaysia Super League in 2004,  it was however relegated from the league, after that first season upon finishing as one of the bottom two teams and thus, the team played in the Malaysian second division in 2005 which by then was known as Malaysia Premier League.

Many Sarawak State Football Team managers or head coaches come and go after Jalil's departure but were unable to bring any success for the team. Jalil even returned as manager from 2005 to 2006, but he too failed to revive the Sarawak State Football Team's glory days of the 1990s, albeit he managed to get the team promoted back to the Malaysian top division league (Malaysia Super League) in 2006. The team would however be relegated to the second division again in 2008. All that uncertainty and underachievement post 1990s era seemingly came to an end after FAS reappointed Dutchman Robert Alberts as manager for the team in 2011, after he had previously managed the team from 2008 to 2009.

Robert Alberts era and the year of the second division "Invincibles" in 2013

Alberts was tasked by FAS which was headed by Sudarsono Osman at the time to bring back Sarawak football to its glory days of the 1990s. Although Alberts' first stint as manager was a less-than-memorable one due to the fact that the team had just been relegated to the Malaysian second division league (Malaysia Premier League) when he took over in at the end 2008 and he failed to get the team promoted in to the 2009 Super League. FAS was however keen to give Alberts a second chance by appointing him midway through the 2011 Premier League season to replace Zaki Sheikh. Alberts did well to get the team promoted to play in the 2012 season of the Malaysian top division Super League but the Sarawak State Football Team however played in the top division for only one season and were relegated again in at the end of the 2012 Super League Season.

Despite playing in the second division in 2013, it however did not deter the spirit of the team and Alberts stayed on to coach the team. He even managed to win a trophy for Sarawak State Football Team by being crowned second division champions in the same year. The success gave Sarawak football fans a reason to celebrate because it was the first time in 15 years that the Sarawak State Football Team had won a trophy. What made the success even sweeter was that the team completed the season campaign unbeaten, with their league record was 18 wins, 4 draws and 0 losses in over 22 games in total. For the feat, that season in the Malaysian football league would come to be known as the "Era of the Invincibles" for the Sarawak State Football Team by their fans. Fans would also praised Alberts for his remarkable job in getting the locals to successfully team up with foreign import players such as Bosnian striker Muamer Salibašić and Cameroonian centre-back Guy Bwele to win the second division title that year. The very same team that won the 2013 second division title also competed in the Malaysia FA Cup and Malaysia Cup that year, but were unable to win both of the cups for their fans.

Life in the Malaysia Super League (2014–2017)
Owing to poor performances of the Sarawak State Football Team in 2015 Malaysia Super League, Alberts' contract with Sarawak was mutually terminated before the season ended in 2015 and was replaced by Fuad Grbesic. Grbesic who is from Bosnia acted as the team's interim manager until the end of the 2015 Super League season. Sarawak State Football Team narrowly escaped relegation that year too.

FAS felt that changes has to be made in order to keep the team in the Super League by appointing former Malaysia national team coach K. Rajagopal at the end of 2015. Rajagopal's stint at Sarawak did not last long either as his contract was terminated the following year on 7 May 2016 after the poor performances shown by Sarawak State Football Team when he was in charge.

Decline
After playing in the Malaysian Super League from 2014 to 2017, the team was relegated Malaysian second division, the Malaysian Premier League, at the end of the 2017 season. Things got worse for the team as they were again relegated Malaysian third division, the Malaysia M3 League, at the end of the 2019 Malaysian Premier League season. What made the relegation to the third division a bitter pill for the team to swallow was that the team was relegated after playing a promotion/ relegation play-off match and losing the match 1–3 against their crosstown rivals, Kuching City FC who were looking for a promotion to play in the Premier League at the time.

Dissolution in 2021
After being relegated to the Malaysian third division in 2019, FAS had tried to rebrand the Sarawak State Football Team as a feeder team to Sarawak United in 2020. Should the Sarawak State Football Team be rebranded as a feeder team, it would also be renamed Sarawak United II for the purpose of competing the in 2020 Malaysia M3 League season but the name change was however not approved by the Malaysian Amateur Football League, the authority which runs the league. The team hence went on to use the Sarawak FA/ Sarawak State Football Team/ Sarawak name when they competed in the league in 2020.

In early 2021, FAS made the announcement that they will not register the Sarawak FA team to compete in the 2021 Season of the third division, the Malaysia M3 League, citing financial constraints. As the team did not compete in the 2021 Malaysia M3 league, many football fans in Malaysia saw this as the end to a once legendary team from Sarawak because the team is not competing in any football competition at the moment.

It is also still unknown or unclear whether Sarawak United will inherit the honours and titles won by Sarawak FA in the future too. Thus the team is considered defunct until FAS or FAM makes further announcement on the status of the team's honours that they have won in the past.

For the record, Sarawak United used to be known as Selangor United which last played in the Malaysian second division (Malaysia Premier League) in 2019. Owing to Selangor United's financial crisis, the team was bought over and rebranded by FAS, in late 2019, for the purpose of having a football team from Sarawak that competes in the Malaysia Premier League in 2020, following the relegation of the Sarawak State Football Team to the third division.

Notable former players 

Apart from Muamer Salibašić, and Bwele Sarawak had many notable players which their fans remembered fondly by fans throughout the years. Among them are James Yaakub, Rosli Akup, Affendi Julaihi, Jalil Ramli, Ramos Sari, Bobby Pian, Mohamad Ali Sapiee, former Scottish-born Australian imports John Hunter and Jeff Curran, former Australian imports such as David Evans (who used to be the longest serving import player in Malaysian football) and Alistair Edwards (who is currently a technical director for Johor Darul Ta'zim F.C.), former Malaysian national team striker Shamsurin Abdul Rahman and many more. Former legendary goalkeeper for the Sarawak FA State Football team of the 1990s Mazlan Wahid also made his name as the best goalkeeper in the country during his stint with the team, while Sarawakians can also be proud that Malaysian footballing legend Safee Sali had played for the team from 2005 to 2006. In recent years, Gilbert Cassidy, Joseph Kalang Tie and Shahrol Saperi were also considered legends of the team as well.

Team nicknames and mascot 
Sarawak was known as The Kenyalang, during the amateur era of Malaysian football. The Kenyalang is a common name by Malaysians for the Great Hornbill bird, which is synonymous with the Malaysian state of Sarawak. In the 1980s, the Black Cats was chosen as the team's pseudonym; however, following series of notorious crocodile attacks at heavily infested rivers in the state during the 1990s, the nick Bujang Senang is chosen to represent Sarawak's chivalric and ferocious play. The name is chosen after a legendary and notorious man-eating crocodile Bujang Senang, who is believed to reside at the Batang Lupar River in the Sri Aman Division. In 1988, under the coach Awang Mahyan Awang Mohamad, he introduced the slogan Ngap Sayot and brought the team to its first Malaysia Cup semi-final, defeating other teams deemed several times to be more stronger than Sarawak, such as Selangor, Kedah, Kuala Lumpur and Pahang. Several other themes then emerged, among them are Ngap Ajak and Tebang Bala Sidak. Recently, the Semangat 88 (Spirit of 88) theme is used alongside Ngap Sayot to emulate the success of the 1980s team.

Stadiums 

The team's current home is the 26,000-seater Sarawak State Stadium at Petra Jaya, Kuching. The team previously played at the adjacent, modern, 40,000-seater Sarawak Stadium until 2011 to make way for 2016 Sukma Games renovation works. The team also previously played at the Jubilee Ground at Padungan Road, Kuching from 1974 until the mid-1980s, before moving to the old (now current) ground. Following facilities upgrade in 1989 for 1990 Sukma Games, the stadium remained as their base until 1997 when they moved to the new stadium after the 1997 FIFA World Youth Championship concluded. The Sarawak Stadium is currently only used as training ground and is expected to host the team home games after the conclusion of 2016 Sukma Games.

Crest and colours

Crest 
Being a Malaysian state football team competing in the Malaysian football league system before 2021, the team wore kits with the crest of the Football Association of Sarawak (FAS) on them, whenever they play any competitive match. Before the year 1995, the team never used any crest or simply used the Sarawak state flag on their kits when playing competitive matches too. The only other time after 1995 that team also wore kits with the Sarawak state flag and without the FAS logo was in 2010. In 2017, the team used an alternate Sarawak FA logo on their kits as well, in which the move was not well received by their fans. The team reverted to using the FAS logo on their kits the following season (in 2018) until the dissolution the team in 2021.

Colours 
The flag of Sarawak has always been an inspiration for kit colour schemes. Historically, the home shirt is red and black, augmented by black or white shorts and red socks. However, colours for both shorts and socks may occasionally change to either black, white or red, according to season's preference. Certain seasons have seen yellow, orange and even white kits worn as first choice kits. Owing to team's success mostly dressed in red and black, the team is sometimes colloquially known as Merah Hitam (the Red and Blacks). Similarly, the away kit is always blue and black; akin to its home kit, colours for both shorts and socks may occasionally change to either blue or white, according to season's preference. Certain seasons have seen white, yellow and navy blue kits worn as change kits.

Sarawak have also introduced a third, or alternate kit in the past. In general, most Sarawak kits are influenced by the colours of top Italian football clubs, AC Milan and Internazionale. Sarawak's first known kit manufacturer is Puma, followed by Diadora. Since 1991, the team has worn Lotto kits, which have witnessed tremendous success and fame before switching to local brand Rossi in September 2001. After nine years, Adidas became the kit of choice for one season in 2010 prior to the appointment of another local brand, Starsport who supplied kits for the team until 2019. The team last wore kits made by Spanish sports clothing manufacturer, Joma in 2020.

Ownership and finances 
Since the 1980s until 2010, all teams competing in Malaysian football leagues are sponsored by single sponsors, namely Dunhill (1980s–05) and Telekom Malaysia (TM) (2006–10), apart from league sponsorship. From season 2011 onwards, the national satellite television Astro takes over as league sponsor, while competing teams are individually sponsored by respective corporates and suppliers.

In addition, the Lea Group of Companies, a local company through their sporting wing, Lea Sports Centre has been Sarawak's shirt sponsor since the 1990s. Previous sponsors include Bank Utama, Power (a brand by Bata), Inai Kiara, Holiday Inn, AirAsia, Larsen Oil & Gas and Naim Holdings, and currently, the team is sponsored by Sarawak Energy, Shin Yang, Ibraco Berhad, Marina Parkcity, Titanium Management, DD Plantations, HSL, Rimbunan Hijau and Lea Sports Centre.

For the 2019 season, Malindo Air became corporate partner and official airline for the Sarawak team, according to the official Sarawak FA Facebook page.

Sponsorship

Honours

Club records

Note:
 P = Played, W = Win, D = Draw, L= Loss, F = Goal for, A = Goal against, Pts = Points, Pos = Position

Source:

Malaysia Cup records

Malaysia FA Cup records

Malaysia Challenge Cup records

Performances in AFC competitions 
 Asian Cup Winners' Cup: 1 appearance
1999: Quarter-final

1 Yangon City Development were unable to field a team for the second leg due to player illness.

Individual player awards

M-League top goalscorers

Players

Last known first-team squad

Development squad

Last known team officials and coaching staff

Head coach history 

  Poasa Sahar (1979–1981)
  Edrus Alwi (1982)
  Alan Bradshaw (1983)
  Chow Kwai Lam (1984)
  Che Su (1985–1987)
  Mahyan Mohammad (1988–1989)
  Wahet Uji (1990–1991, 2005)
  Alan Vest (1992–1998)
  Jalil Rambli (1999–2003, 2005–2006)
  Trevor Morgan (2004)
  Pengiran Bala (2007, 2017–2018)
  Mohammad Mentali (2007–2008)
  Kunju Jamaluddin (2008)
  Fairuz Yunus (2008)
  Robert Alberts (2008–2009, 2011–2015)
  Zaki Sheikh (2009–2011)
  K. Rajagopal (2015)
  David Usop (2016–2017)
  Ian Gillan (2018)
  Pengiran Bala (2018)
  Mohd Farhan Abdullah (2019)
  Sam Timbe (2020)

Head coaches with honours 
The following coaches won at least one trophy when in charge of Sarawak:

References

External links 
 
 Sarawak football supporters website
 FA Sarawak team latest statistics
 FA Sarawak individual player stats

Defunct football clubs in Malaysia
 
Malaysia Premier League clubs
Football clubs in Malaysia
Association football clubs established in 1974
1974 establishments in Malaysia
Football associations in Malaysia
Sports organizations established in 1974
Malaysia M3 League